Helle Simonsen may refer to:

 Helle Simonsen (curler) (born 1984), Danish curler
 Helle Simonsen (handballer) (born 1976), Danish handball player